Chris Hogan may refer to:
 Chris Hogan (actor), American actor and comedian
 Chris Hogan (American football) (born 1988), American football wide receiver for the New Orleans Saints of the National Football League 
 Chris Hogan (finance expert), American radio show host, author and personal finance expert